The Life and Legend of Wyatt Earp is the first Western television series written for adults, premiering four days before Gunsmoke on September 6, 1955. Two weeks later came the Clint Walker western Cheyenne. The series is loosely based on the life of frontier marshal Wyatt Earp. The half-hour, black-and-white program aired for six seasons (229 episodes) on ABC from 1955 to 1961, with Hugh O'Brian in the title role.

Plot 
The first season of the series purports to tell the story of Wyatt's experiences as deputy town marshal of Ellsworth, Kansas (first four episodes), and then as  town marshal in Wichita. In the second episode of the second season, first aired September 4, 1956, he is hired as assistant city marshal of Dodge City, where the setting remained for three seasons. The final episode set in Dodge City (Season 5, Episode 1 - "Dodge City: Hail and Farewell") aired on September 1, 1959. Beginning the next week on September 8, 1959 (Season 5, Episode 2 - "The Trail to Tombstone"), the locale shifted to Tombstone, Arizona Territory, for the remainder of the series.

Cast

Main cast
 Hugh O'Brian as Wyatt Earp (229 episodes)
 Morgan Woodward as "Shotgun" Gibbs (81 episodes)
 Ray Kellogg as Deputy Ollie (13 episodes)
 William Tannen as Deputy Hal Norton (56 episodes)
 Douglas Fowley/Myron Healey as John H. "Doc" Holliday (49 episodes/10 episodes)
 Mason Alan Dinehart as Bat Masterson (34 episodes)
 Fred Coby as Pony Deal (5 episodes)
 Damian O'Flynn as Judge Tobin/Dr. Goodfellow/Doc Fabrique (68 episodes)
 Ray Boyle as Morgan Earp (15 episodes)
 John Anderson/Ross Elliott as Virgil Earp (5 episodes/4 episodes)
 Bill Cassady as Dr. McCarty (11 episodes)

Recurring cast
 Jimmy Noel as Townsman (144 episodes)
 Ethan Laidlaw as Townsman (138 episodes)
 Bill Coontz as Townsman (99 episodes)
 Chet Brandenburg as Townsman (79 episodes)
 Buddy Roosevelt as Townsman (65 episodes)
 Kermit Maynard as Townsman (48 episodes)
 Frank Mills as Townsman (36 episodes)
 Archie Butler as Townsman (32 episodes)
 Milan Smith as Townsman (16 episodes)
 Albert Cavens as Townsman (16 episodes)
 Tex Palmer as Townsman (15 episodes)
 Herman Hack as Townsman (10 episodes)
 Chick Hannan as Townsman (6 episodes)
 Alex Sharp as Townsman (4 episodes)
 Paul Brinegar/Ralph Sanford as James H. "Dog" Kelley (34 episodes/21 episodes)
 Rico Alaniz as Mr. Cousin (19 episodes)
 Rodd Redwing as Mr. Brother (8 episodes)
 James Seay as Judge Wells Spicer (25 episodes)
 Don Haggerty as Marsh Murdock (21 episodes)
 Trevor Bardette as Newman Haynes Clanton (21 episodes)
 John Milford/Rayford Barnes as Ike Clanton (8 episodes)
 Carol Thurston as Emma Clanton (7 episodes)
 William Phipps as Curly Bill Brocius (16 episodes)
 Randy Stuart as Nellie Cashman (12 episodes)
 Carol Montgomery Stone/Collette Lyons as "Big Nose Kate" (10 episodes/4 episodes)
 Steve Brodie/Lash La Rue as Sheriff Johnny Behan, member of the Ten Percent Ring (9 episodes/8 episodes)
 Gregg Palmer as Tom McLowery (4 episodes)
 Margaret Hayes as Dora Hand (3 episodes)
 Denver Pyle/Walter Coy as Ben Thompson (8 episodes/1 episode)
 Bob Steele as Deputy Sam (4 episodes)
 Donald Murphy/Norman Alden as Johnny Ringo/Johnny Ringgold (6 episodes)
 William Mims as Dameron (6 episodes)
 Walter Maslow as Dick Averill/Blackie Saunders (5 episodes)
 Barney Phillips as Lou Rickabaugh (3 episodes)
 Norman Leavitt as Mr. Phillips (2 episodes)

Guest cast
On September 25, 1956, Myron Healey played a drunken gunfighter Clay Allison, who comes into Dodge City to confront the Earp legend. In the story line, Pete Albright, a storeowner played by Charles Fredricks, tries to hire Allison to gun down Earp because the marshal is fighting crime in the town and costing merchants business in the process. Allison makes a point of not taking money, but is willing to challenge Earp until he is overcome by his own drunkenness. Mike Ragan played Clay Allison in a 1957 episode, "The Time for All Good Men".

Production

Development
The series was produced by Desilu Productions and filmed at the Desilu-Cahuenga Studio. Sponsors included General Mills, Procter & Gamble, and Parker Pen Company.  Off-camera the Ken Darby singers, a choral group, sang the theme song and hummed the background music.  The theme song "The Legend of Wyatt Earp" was composed by Harry Warren.  Incidental music was composed by Herman Stein.

Casting
O'Brian was chosen for the role in part because of his physical resemblance to early photographs of Wyatt Earp.

Douglas Fowley and Myron Healey were cast 49 and 10 times, respectively, as Earp's close friend John H. "Doc" Holliday.

Mason Alan Dinehart, or Alan Dinehart, III, son of film stars Alan Dinehart and Mozelle Britton, was cast in 34 episodes between 1955 and 1959 as Bat Masterson, a role filled on the NBC series of the same name by the late Gene Barry. Dinehart played Masterson from the ages of 19 to 23.

Many episodes show Douglas Fowley as playing the part of Doc Fabrique when he actually is not in the episodes.  O'Flynn was left off the credits most of the time.

Bob Steele played Wyatt's deputy, Sam, in four episodes in 1955 during the Wichita period.

Use of Buntline Special 
In the show, O'Brian openly carried a Buntline Special, a pistol with a 12-inch barrel, which triggered a mild toy craze at the time the series was originally broadcast. No credible evidence has been found that Wyatt Earp ever owned such a gun. The myth of Earp carrying a Buntline Special was created in Stuart N. Lake's best-selling 1931 biography Wyatt Earp: Frontier Marshal, later admitted by the author to be highly fictionalized.

Historical Accuracy
The real Wyatt Earp was appointed as an assistant marshal in Dodge City around May 1876, spent the winter of 1876–77 in Deadwood, Dakota Territory, and rejoined the Dodge City police force as an assistant marshal in spring 1877. He resigned his position in September 1879. Earp is depicted as the town marshal in Tombstone, although his brother Virgil Earp was Deputy U.S. Marshal and Tombstone City Marshal. As city marshal, Virgil made the decision to enforce a city ordinance prohibiting carrying weapons in town and to disarm the outlaw cowboys that led to the Gunfight at the O.K. Corral. Wyatt was only a temporary assistant marshal to his brother.

Episodes

Reception

Ratings
The Life and Legend of Wyatt Earp finished number 18 in the Nielsen ratings for the 1956–1957 season, number six in 1957–1958, number 10 in 1958–1959, and number 20 in 1959–1960.

Awards
The series received two Emmy nominations in 1957. Hugh O'Brian was nominated for Best Continuing Performance by an Actor, and Dan Ullman earned a nomination for Best Teleplay Writing - Half Hour or Less.

Home media
Infinity Entertainment Group released the complete first season on DVD in Region 1 for the first time on April 21, 2009. This release has been discontinued and is now out of print. On October 28, 2011, Inception Media Group acquired the rights to the series. It subsequently re-released the first season on DVD on December 13, 2011. Season two was released on March 12, 2013.

Related shows 
O'Brian recreated the role of Earp in two episodes of the CBS television series Guns of Paradise (1990) alongside Gene Barry as Bat Masterson and again in 1991 in The Gambler Returns: The Luck of the Draw, also with Barry as Masterson. An independent movie, Wyatt Earp: Return to Tombstone, was released in 1994 featuring new footage of O'Brian as Earp mixed with flashbacks consisting of colorized scenes from the original series. The new sequences co-starred Bruce Boxleitner (who had himself played Earp in the telefilm I Married Wyatt Earp), Paul Brinegar (who later joined the Rawhide cast), Harry Carey, Jr. (who had, a year earlier, played Marshal Fred White in Tombstone), and Bo Hopkins.

With the emergence of television in the 1950s, producers spun out a large number of Western-oriented shows. At the height of their popularity in 1959,  more than two dozen "cowboy" programs were on weekly. At least five others were connected to some extent with Wyatt Earp: Bat Masterson, Tombstone Territory, Broken Arrow, Johnny Ringo, and Gunsmoke.

Episodes of The Life and Legend of Wyatt Earp are rebroadcast on the cable television network, Grit.  Two episodes of the show are aired daily on Cozi TV.

References

External links

 Wyatt Earp and the "Buntline Special" Myth
 
 
 
 
 Production notes on TV series

Life and Legend of Wyatt Earp, The
Life and Legend of Wyatt Earp, The
Life and Legend of Wyatt Earp, The
Life and Legend of Wyatt Earp, The
Black-and-white American television shows
Television shows set in Kansas
Television shows set in Arizona
Television series by Desilu Productions
American folklore films and television series
Cultural depictions of Wyatt Earp
Cultural depictions of Doc Holliday
Cultural depictions of Bat Masterson
Cultural depictions of Big Nose Kate
Cultural depictions of Johnny Ringo
1960s Western (genre) television series
Western (genre) television series featuring gimmick weapons